Hendecasticha is a genus of moths belonging to the subfamily Olethreutinae of the family Tortricidae. This genus was described by Edward Meyrick in 1881. It consists of only one species, Hendecasticha aethaliana, which is endemic to New Zealand.

References

Tortricidae genera
Olethreutinae
Monotypic moth genera
Taxa named by Edward Meyrick
Endemic fauna of New Zealand
Moths of New Zealand
Endemic moths of New Zealand